Luke Philp (born November 6, 1995) is a Canadian professional ice hockey forward who currently plays with the  Chicago Blackhawks of the National Hockey League (NHL).

Playing career 
Philp played as a youth within the AMBHL, AMHL and AJHL before he was selected in the 2010 WHL Bantam Draft by the Kootenay Ice, in the third-round, 59th overall.

Philp appeared in parts of five major junior season with the Kootenay Ice of the Western Hockey League, before ending his junior career as captain of the Red Deer Rebels in the 2015–16 season.

Undrafted, Philp opted to play collegiate hockey by committing to the University of Alberta and playing three seasons of USports hockey. In starring for the Alberta Golden Bears, Philp as the two-time West Conference MVP and  League MVP, was signed to a two-year, entry-level contract with the Calgary Flames on March 20, 2019.

In turning professional, Philp was reassigned to begin his career with the Flames' AHL affiliate, the Stockton Heat. With his offensive instinct's translating at the AHL, Philp was amongst the Heat's leading scorers in both COVID-19 pandemic affected seasons of his entry-level contract, earning a one-year, two-way contract extension within the Flames organization for the 2021–22 season on August 7, 2021.

Returning for his third season with the Heat, Philp placed fourth on team scoring in registering career bests of 21 goals and 23 assists for 44 points in 66 games. He notched a further 5 points in 10 playoff games in helping the Heat reach the Conference Finals in their final season.

As a free agent from the Flames, Philp was signed to a one-year, two-way contract with the Chicago Blackhawks on July 14, 2022. After attending the Blackhawks 2022 training camp, Philp was familiarly reassigned to the AHL, joining affiliate the Rockford IceHogs. In the  season, Philp notched 30 points through his first 31 games with the IceHogs to earn his first recall to the NHL, on January 23, 2023. He made his debut with the rebuilding Blackhawks the following day in a 5–2 defeat to the Vancouver Canucks. He registered his first point, an game-winning assist, in his second career game during a 5–1 defeat over former club, the Calgary Flames, on January 26, 2023. He was returned to the AHL to continue his tenure with the IceHogs on January 29, 2023. He was later signed by the Blackhawks to a one-year, two-way contract extension on March 9, 2023.

Personal life
Philp is the middle of three hockey playing brothers, with the youngest Noah Philp playing as a prospect within the Edmonton Oilers organization. He played with his older brother, Simon, during his tenure in the AJHL with the Canmore Eagles in 2012.

Career statistics

Awards and honours

References

External links
 

1995 births
Living people
Alberta Golden Bears ice hockey players
Canadian ice hockey forwards
Canmore Eagles players
Chicago Blackhawks players
Kootenay Ice players
Red Deer Rebels players
Rockford IceHogs (AHL) players
Stockton Heat players
Undrafted National Hockey League players